Malcolm James (21 August 1905 – 26 May 1979) was an Australian rules footballer who played with Essendon in the Victorian Football League (VFL).

Notes

External links 
		

1905 births
1979 deaths
Australian rules footballers from Victoria (Australia)
Essendon Football Club players
People from Dromana, Victoria